Count Johann Hermann von Heeren (4 October 1833 – 6 May 1899) was a German diplomat from the Hanseatic Cities.

Early life
Heeren was born on 4 October 1833 in Waldenau, Holstein and was the son of Georg Heinrich Heeren and Amanda Juliane von Hollen. He had a twin sister Ida Wilhelmine Heeren (1833–1898), who was married to Heinrich Amsinck. He was also a great-nephew of the historian Arnold Hermann Ludwig Heeren.

Heened studied law at the University of Heidelberg and graduated from the University of Göttingen. At, he became active in the German Student Corps in 1854 and the Corps Hannovera Göttingen in 1855.

Career

In 1864, Heeren succeeded Vincent Rumpff as Minister Resident in Paris of the three free Hanseatic cities of Bremen, Hamburg and Lübeck the Imperial French court of Napoléon III. In December 1868, he was made a Commander of the Legion of Honor. When the Franco-Prussian War broke out in 1870, he helped Empress Eugénie de Montijo escape from Paris via Deauville into exile in London. Heeren then resigned from his post as diplomatic representative of the cities in Paris. After the unification of the German Empire, the Prussian diplomat Harry von Arnim who had featured prominently in the negotiation of the Treaty of Frankfurt served as the German Ambassador in Paris.

Later life
He retired in Bavaria and acquired the Rottenbuch estate in Ammerthal from the former Rottenbuch monastery. He also owned a brewery in Rottenbuch and founded a family fideikommiss.

On 28 July 1889, Luitpold, Prince Regent of Bavaria elevated him to the Bavarian nobility due to his services to Bavaria's agriculture.

Personal life

Johann Hermann von Heeren was married to Spanish-born Maria del Carmen Heeren y Massa (1849–1924), the daughter of Karl August Heeren and the former Maria de los Dolores Ramona Angela Baldomera Massa y Grana. he had four children:

 August Wilhelm Alexander von Heeren (1870–1927), a landowner in Rottenbuch who served as Imperial Privy Councilor in Strasbourg; he married Jeanne-Marie von Sonnenberg.
 Eggebert Hermann von Heeren (1880–1957), First Lieutenant in the Air Force, landowner at Eppishausen Castle near Erlen in Thurgau (Switzerland).
 Viktor von Heeren (1881–1949), who served as envoy to Prague and Belgrade.
 Maria del Consuelo von Heeren (1889–1952)

Von Heeren died on 6 May 1899 in Rottenbuch in Upper Bavaria.

References
Notes

Sources

External links

1833 births
1899 deaths
Hanseatic diplomats
Diplomats from Hamburg
Heidelberg University alumni
University of Göttingen alumni
Ambassadors of Germany to France